Renate Gärtner (born 1 October 1952) is a German athlete. She competed in the women's high jump at the 1972 Summer Olympics, representing West Germany.

References

External links
 

1952 births
Living people
Athletes (track and field) at the 1972 Summer Olympics
German female high jumpers
Olympic athletes of West Germany
People from Fulda (district)
Sportspeople from Kassel (region)